Söder om kärleken (South of love) is a 2009 album by the Swedish singer and songwriter Sofia Karlsson, her fourth studio album.

Album
Söder om kärleken is Sofia Karlsson's fourth studio album. Magnus Eriksson, writing in the Swedish national daily newspaper Svenska Dagbladet, said that the melodies were soft, caressing, slightly lilting, like the lyrics, giving an immediate and close expression for her experience. Karlsson captured the nuances of love with supreme precision. If love was ambiguous, her lyrics were crystal clear and beautiful.

Christel Hofberg, interviewing Karlsson in the Swedish newspaper Göteborgs Posten, said that Karlsson had made a fresh start with the album, all of it being her own work except for two songs co-written. The lyrics were extremely personal: "South of Love" named a warm place where one could stand and look at love.

The FolkWorld music review website wrote that it respected Karlsson for daring to record her own compositions after her two albums of covers. It liked the "solid guitar, nice violin" and other instruments, Blåsut being reminiscent of Alison Krauss in style and sound. The reviewer singled out Stjärnor över Asahikawa (Stars over Asahikawa) as a fragile, sensitive song where Karlsson was at her best. While the album was less adventurous than her earlier work, it was beautiful and would please listeners who liked Karlsson's style, fitting "perfectly in her repertoire".

Anders Dahlbom, writing on the Swedish news and culture website Nöje (part of the Swedish national tabloid Expressen) described the album as having less bite than her earlier albums, but still with a voice that always gets one to stand up and listen. Dahlbom called it Americana with a melancholy shimmer, folk music that vibrated with sensitivity and the joy of performing.

The album won a gold disk in 2011.

Track listing
All the songs are by Sofia Karlsson.

 Du Var Där (You were there) 2:57
 Skärmabrink (Screen edge) 2:29
 Smält Mig Till Glöd (Melt me red hot) 3:30
 Andra Sidan (Side Two) 2:53
 Dadgad (Dadgad) 2:41
 Dina Händer (Göteborg) (Your hands (Gothenburg)) 4:34
 Stjärnor Över Asahikawa (Stars over Asahikawa) 5:59
 Visa Från Kåkbrinken (Song from Kåkbrinken Street) 2:35
 Blåsut (Blåsut, Stockholm) 2:47
 Regn över Årsta (Rain over Årsta) 3:11
 Andra Sidan (Repris) (Side Two (reprise)) 0:43
 Imma På Fönstret (Imma in the window) 3:02
 Alltid Dig Nära (Always near you) 3:28
 Näktergalen (bonus track) (The nightingale) 3:07

Performers

Sofia Karlsson —  vocals, Irish transverse flute, Wurlitzer, guitar, whistle, bouzouki, guitar, glockenspiel, Hammond B3, tenor guitar, transverse flute
 Gustaf Ljunggren - guitar, pedal steel, vocals, resonator guitar, lap steel, melody banjo, mandola, mando guitar, bass clarinet, clarinet, flute, tenor guitar
 Henry Cederblom - electric guitar, dobro, guitar
 Sofie Livebrant - vocals
 Roger Tallroth - 12-string guitar, tenor guitar, cittern
 Stuart Duncan - violin, mandolin
 Mike Marshall - mandolin
 Staffan Lindfors - bass, vocals
 Olle Linder - bass, drums
 Per Ekdahl - shaker
 Fredrik Gille - percussion
 Per Svenner - floor tom
 Gideon Andersson - guitar
 Bent Clausen - vibraphone

Charts

Weekly charts

Year-end charts

References 

2009 albums
Sofia Karlsson (singer) albums